North Carolina's 28th Senate district is one of 50 districts in the North Carolina Senate. It has been represented by Democrat Gladys Robinson since 2011.

Geography
Since 2003, the district has included part of Guilford County. The district overlaps with the 57th, 58th, 59th, 61st and 62nd state house districts.

District officeholders

Multi-member district

Single-member district

Election results

2022

2020

2018

2016

2014

2012

2010

2008

2006

2004

2002

2000

References

North Carolina Senate districts
Guilford County, North Carolina